Mukhomukhi is an Indian Bengali language film directed by Kamaleshwar Mukherjee. The film is based on a drama Abayab written by the director himself. The film released in India on 1 February 2019.

Plot 
Agnibha (Played by Rajatava) is a novelist Isha's (Played by Gargee) biggest critic. So, when he adds a twist to her latest story about an estranged couple, (played by Jisshu and Paayel), things quickly drift towards an uncertain end.

Cast 
 Jisshu Sengupta
 Rajatava Dutta
 Gargi Roychowdhury
 Darshana Banik
  Payel Sarkar
 Ushasie Chakraborty
 Padmanabha Dasgupta

References

External links
 

2019 films
Films directed by Kamaleshwar Mukherjee
Bengali-language Indian films
2010s Bengali-language films